In the 1975–76 Associazione Calcio Torino competed in Serie A and Coppa Italia.

Summary
The team placed first in the 1975–76 League season being their seventh Serie A title ever. The scudetto was won after a comeback against Juventus, who held a five-point advantage over the Granata during the spring. However, three straight losses for the Bianconeri, the second of which was in the derby, allowed Torino to overtake. In the final round, Torino held a one-point advantage and, until then, had won every previous home fixture. Torino hosted Cesena at the Comunale but could only manage to draw; Juventus, however, were defeated at Perugia. The title was won by two points ahead of Juventus, 27 years after the Superga tragedy.

Squad

(Captain)

Transfers

Competitions

Serie A

League table

Results by round

Matches

Coppa Italia

Knock out round

Statistics

Player stats

Goalscorers
21.Paolo Pulici
15.Francesco Graziani
4.Zaccarelli 
2.Pecci
1.Sala C.
1.Gorin F.
1.Garritano

Appearances
30.Sala P.
30.Salvadori
30.Pulici P.	
29.Graziani F.
29.Pecci	
29.Sala C.
29.Mozzini 
29.Castellini
28.Caporale
28.Zaccarelli
25.Santin
12.Gorin F.
5.Garritano
4.Pallavicini
3.Cazzaniga
3.Lombardo
1.Pacchin

References

External links
  RSSSF - Italy 1975/76

Torino F.C. seasons
Torino
Italian football championship-winning seasons